Constantino Federico Saragoza (born 18 July 1965) is a windsurfer who represented the Netherlands Antilles. He competed at the 1992 Summer Olympics and the 1996 Summer Olympics.

References

External links
 

1965 births
Living people
Dutch Antillean windsurfers
Dutch Antillean male sailors (sport)
Olympic sailors of the Netherlands Antilles
Sailors at the 1992 Summer Olympics – Lechner A-390
Sailors at the 1996 Summer Olympics – Mistral One Design
Place of birth missing (living people)